Max Kaminsky may refer to:

Max Kaminsky (musician) (1908–1994), jazz musician
Max Kaminsky (ice hockey player) (1912–1961), ice hockey player and coach